Pushkinskaya Square or Pushkin Square is a pedestrian open space in the Tverskoy District in central Moscow. Historically, it was known as Strastnaya Square before being renamed for Alexander Pushkin in 1937.

It is not only one of the busiest city squares in Moscow, but also one of the busiest in the world.

The former Strastnaya Square name originates from the Passion Monastery (Strastnoy Monastery), which was demolished in the 1930s by the Soviet regime.

At the center of the square is a statue of Pushkin, funded by public subscription and unveiled by Ivan Turgenev and Fyodor Dostoyevsky in 1880. In 1950, Joseph Stalin had the statue moved to the other side of the Tverskaya Street, where the historic Passion Monastery had formerly stood. On 5 December 1965, Glasnost Meeting, the first spontaneous public political demonstration in the Soviet Union after the Second World War, took place here.

References

External links
 
 3D model of Pushkinskaya Square

Squares in Moscow
Cultural depictions of Alexander Pushkin
Statues of writers
Tverskoy District